Bolton Lake is a lake in the Moose River drainage basin in Timiskaming District, Ontario, Canada. The primary inflow is an unnamed creek from Winding Lake, and the primary outflow is an unnamed creek to Lloyd Lake, which eventually flows into the Grassy River, and then the Mattagami River into the Moose River.

References

Lakes of Timiskaming District